Buk-gu is a non-autonomous district in the City of Pohang in North Gyeongsang Province, South Korea.

Administrative divisions 

Buk-gu is divided into one town (eup), 6 townships (myeon), and 8 neighbourhoods (dong).

Points of interest
Anguksa, a Hindu temple

See also 
 Nam-gu, Pohang

References

External links 
  

Districts of Pohang